K. D. Bhandari is a businessman turned politician in India and belongs to the ruling Bharatiya Janta Party (BJP). He was a member of Punjab Legislative Assembly and represented Jalandhar North.

Family
His father's name is Chanan Ram. He has 3 children.

Career
Government.

References

Living people
Punjab, India MLAs 2012–2017
Year of birth missing (living people)
Place of birth missing (living people)
People from Jalandhar
Punjab, India MLAs 2007–2012
Bharatiya Janata Party politicians from Punjab